Doppelmayer is the remains of a lunar impact crater that lies on the southwest edge of Mare Humorum. It was named after the German mathematician and astronomer Johann Gabriel Doppelmayr. To the south-southeast is another flooded crater designated Lee, and to the southeast is Vitello. Just to the east-northeast of Doppelmayer lies the nearly submerged crater Puiseux.

The rim of Doppelmayer is nearly round, but is worn and eroded. The most intact section is the southwest half, while in the northeast the rim descends beneath the mare, leaving only a slight rise in the surface. The interior has been flooded by lava, leaving a large raised ridge in the center. A small range of hills curves to the west and north from the southern end of this ridge, forming a feature that is nearly concentric with the crater's outer rim.

Satellite craters
By convention these features are identified on lunar maps by placing the letter on the side of the crater midpoint that is closest to Doppelmayer.

References

 
 
 
 
 
 
 
 
 
 
 

Impact craters on the Moon